Douglas A. Ley (July 3, 1958 – June 10, 2021) was an American educator and politician who served in the New Hampshire House of Representatives from Cheshire District 9 from 2013 to 2021, as a member of the Democratic Party. During his tenure in the state house he served as Majority Leader from 2018 to 2020.

Early life and education
Douglas Ley was born in Long Island, New York and grew up in Valley Stream, New York and Newtown, Connecticut. Ley graduated from Newtown High School. He graduated from Gettysburg College in 1980, with a bachelor's degree in history. He became a history professor at Franklin Pierce University in 1991. He served as president of his local American Federation of Teachers union from 2013 to 2021, and as president of the state American Federation of Teachers. He married Mary, with whom he had two children.

New Hampshire House of Representatives

Elections
In 2012, Ley ran for a seat in the New Hampshire House of Representatives from Cheshire District 9 with the Democratic nomination and won in the general election alongside Richard Ames out of four candidates. Ley and Ames won reelection in the 2014 election out of four candidates in the general election. They won reelection in the 2016 election out of four candidates in the general election. They won reelection in the 2018 election out of three candidates. Ley and Ames won reelection in the 2020 election out of four candidates in the general election.

Tenure
During Ley's tenure he served on the Labor committee from 2013 to 2018. He defeated Representative Dick Hinch in the vote to become Majority Leader of the state house by a vote of 237 to 152 in 2018. He served as Majority Leader from 2018 to 2020.

Death
Ley was hospitalized in May 2021, after cancer spread to his liver. Ley died on June 10, 2021 at the age of 62 at his home in Jaffrey, and was the third member of the state house to have died in the 2021-2022 session of the state house after Speaker Hinch and Representative David Danielson.

Electoral history

References

External links

1958 births
2021 deaths
21st-century American politicians
Deaths from cancer in New Hampshire
Franklin Pierce University faculty
Democratic Party members of the New Hampshire House of Representatives
People from Long Island
People from Jaffrey, New Hampshire
University of Wisconsin–Madison College of Letters and Science alumni